Kaira, sometimes called frilled orbweavers, is a mostly neotropical genus of orb-weaver spiders first described by O. Pickard-Cambridge in 1889. It includes sixteen described species that occur from South America up to the southern and eastern USA. It is presumably related to Aculepeira, Amazonepeira and Metepeira.

They spin small webs from which they hang upside down and attract male moths that fly into a basket formed by their legs. They use a moth pheromone for this, which resembles the one used by the bolas spiders of the genus Mastophora. Though they belong to the same family, the two genera are not closely related, so this is likely an example of convergent evolution.

All species are pale yellow-white with scattered, small, white, brown and black random spots, or in some species transverse bands. Males are less than half the size of females and less pigmented.

Kaira specimens are uncommon in arachnologist collections, and the females of different species are difficult to separate. Females and immatures can be confused with species of the not closely related genus Pozonia.

Behavior
Then she clamped her legs around it and killed it. Instead of constructing orb webs, they construct a small trapezoidal web, containing two triangular zigzags of threads, which is remade every twenty minutes. The spider then hangs upside-down by the fourth leg on the lower and shorter parallel edge of the trapezoid, which is spread by the other legs. When a moth flies into the basket formed by the spider's legs, it is clasped and bitten, and later wrapped in araneid-like fashion. The moth is then hung from a trapeze line between the last legs of the spider, which resumes the hunting posture. As many as eight moths can be caught in this way before the spider starts feeding.

Species
 it contains sixteen species:
Kaira alba (Hentz, 1850) – USA, Mexico
Kaira altiventer O. Pickard-Cambridge, 1889 – USA to Brazil
Kaira candidissima (Mello-Leitão, 1941) – Argentina
Kaira cobimcha Levi, 1993 – Brazil
Kaira conica Gerschman & Schiapelli, 1948 – Brazil, Argentina
Kaira dianae Levi, 1993 – Peru
Kaira echinus (Simon, 1897) – Brazil, Argentina
Kaira electa (Keyserling, 1883) – Brazil
Kaira erwini Levi, 1993 – Peru
Kaira gibberosa O. Pickard-Cambridge, 1890 – Mexico to Brazil
Kaira hiteae Levi, 1977 – USA
Kaira levii Alayón, 1993 – Cuba
Kaira sabino Levi, 1977 – USA
Kaira sexta (Chamberlin, 1916) – Guatemala to Brazil
Kaira shinguito Levi, 1993 – Peru
Kaira tulua Levi, 1993 – Colombia

References

Araneidae
Araneomorphae genera
Spiders of North America
Spiders of Central America
Spiders of South America